The 2004 Estonian Figure Skating Championships were held in Tallinn from December 20 to 22, 2003. Skaters competed in the disciplines of men's singles, ladies' singles, pair skating, and ice dancing.

Senior results

Men

Ladies

Pairs

Junior results
The 2004 Estonian Junior Figure Skating Championships took place in Tallinn from January 23 through 25, 2004.

Men

Ladies
12 participants

Ice dancing

References

Figure Skating Championships
Estonian Figure Skating Championships, 2004
Estonian Figure Skating Championships